The Nearly Man is a UK TV play and series from the mid-1970s, about a middle-class Labour MP. Both play and series were written by Arthur Hopcraft; actors in the cast of both include Tony Britton in the title role, Wilfred Pickles, Ann Firbank and Michael Elphick.

The play was originally screened on ITV on 4 August 1974, and won the Broadcasting Press Guild award for the best single play on British television that year. The series was filmed in London by Granada Television, and broadcast late the following year. Some episodes were directed by British directors Alan Grint and John Irvin.

Scriptwriter
Arthur Hopcraft was a well-respected UK scriptwriter known for his adaptations of TV plays and novels. He won the BAFTA writer's award in 1985, and is best known for TV miniseries including Tinker Tailor Soldier Spy (1979), Bleak House (1985), A Perfect Spy (1987) and A Tale of Two Cities (1989).

References

External links

1970s British drama television series
1974 British television series debuts
ITV television dramas
Television shows produced by Granada Television
English-language television shows